Technology Is God is the debut studio album by Max M, released on January 1, 1992, on Hard Records.

Reception
Critic David Sears of Option gave Technology Is God a positive review and said "Max M deftly weaves tight and biting samples with vocals" that "handily evokes the ghost in the machine."

Track listing

Personnel
Adapted from the Technology Is God liner notes.

Max M
 Max Møller Rasmussen – vocals, instruments, producer, design

Additional performers
 Captain Baxter – remixer (10)
 Carsten Lassen – guitar (1, 2, 12, 13)
 Claus Pedersen – guitar (3)
 Lasse Mosegaard (as Dr. Illington) – producer (1)

Release history

References

External links 
 
 Technology Is God at Discogs (list of releases)
 Technology Is God at iTunes

1992 debut albums
Max M albums